The eponymous debut album by American nu metal band Motograter was released on June 24, 2003. Although the album has a total of 22 tracks, half of them are short, static tracks, which are all the names of the tracks reversed. For instance, Eman On is a reversed version of No Name, and a message can clearly be heard in the last five seconds. This is the band's only release to feature Ivan Moody as lead vocalist as well as all other band members with the exception of Matt Nunes.

Track listing

In other media
"Down" is featured on NASCAR Thunder 2004.
"Suffocate" is featured in The Texas Chainsaw Massacre.
"New Design" is featured in WWE Studios' feature film The Mania of WrestleMania, filmed on location at WrestleMania XIX in 2003.

Personnel
Ivan "Ghost" Moody – vocals
Matt "Nuke" Nunes – guitars
J.R. Swartz – guitars
Bruce "Grater" Butler – motograter
Chris "Crispy" Binns – drums
Joey "Smur" Krzywonski – percussion
Zak "The Waz" Ward – vocals/electronics/samples

References

2003 debut albums
Motograter albums
Elektra Records albums
Albums produced by James Barton (producer)